Player FM or PlayerFM is a podcast discovery and cataloguing service which lists podcasts hosted across different podcast publishing sites. It was created by software designer Michael Mahemoff in 2011. The service was acquired by Maple Media, a mobile media company, in May 2020 for an undisclosed amount.

References

British companies established in 2011
2011 establishments in England
Digital audio distributors
Internet properties established in 2011
British music websites
Music streaming services
Companies based in London
Podcasting software